The New York Rangers are an American ice hockey franchise that competes in the National Hockey League (NHL). One of the NHL's "Original Six" teams, the Rangers play in the Metropolitan Division of the Eastern Conference. Since 1968, the team has played its home games in Madison Square Garden. In 95 completed seasons (excluding the lockout-canceled 2004–05 season), the team has won four Stanley Cup championships and has qualified for the playoffs sixty-one times. As of the end of the 2021–22 season, New York has won more than 2,900 regular-season games, the fifth-highest victory total among NHL teams.

The Rangers were founded in 1926, and won their first Stanley Cup title in 1928, making them the first U.S.-based NHL franchise to win the Cup. Over the next 12 seasons, New York reached the Stanley Cup Finals five times and won twice, in 1933 and 1940. The Rangers then entered a period of decline; from 1943 to 1966, New York missed the playoffs 18 times. During that time, the Rangers reached the 1950 Stanley Cup Finals, where they lost to the Detroit Red Wings. In the 1970s, the Rangers made the Stanley Cup Finals twice, but were defeated by the Boston Bruins in 1972 and by the Montreal Canadiens in 1979. Thirteen years later, in the 1991–92 season, New York won the Presidents' Trophy by leading the NHL in regular-season points with 105. The team, however, was eliminated in the second round of the playoffs.

After missing the playoffs in the 1992–93 season, the Rangers accumulated 112 points in the 1993–94 season and won their second Presidents' Trophy. With a seven-game victory against the Vancouver Canucks in the 1994 Stanley Cup Finals, the Rangers ended a 54-year Stanley Cup drought. After reaching the Eastern Conference Finals in 1997, the Rangers did not return to the playoffs until 2006. In the 2013–14 season, the Rangers reached the Stanley Cup Finals for the first time in 20 years, defeating the Canadiens in the Eastern Conference Finals in six games before losing to the Los Angeles Kings in the championship series. New York earned its third Presidents' Trophy with a team record 113 points in 2014–15, but was eliminated in the Conference Finals by the Tampa Bay Lightning. In the most recent season, 2021–22, the Rangers finished second in the Metropolitan Division with 110 points and lost again in the Conference Finals to the Lightning in the 2022 playoffs.

Table key

Year by year

Notes
From the 1926–27 season to the 1937–38 season, the Rangers played in the American Division.
From the 1938–39 season to the 1966–67 season, the NHL had no divisions.
Before the 1967–68 season, the NHL split into East and West Divisions because of the addition of six expansion teams.
The NHL realigned before the 1974–75 season. The Rangers were placed in the Clarence Campbell Conference's Patrick Division.
Before the 1981–82 season, the NHL moved the Patrick Division to the Prince of Wales Conference.
The NHL realigned into Eastern and Western conferences prior to the 1993–94 season. New York was placed in the Atlantic Division of the Eastern Conference.
The season was shortened to 48 games because of the 1994–95 NHL lockout.
Beginning with the 1999–2000 season, teams received one point for losing a regular-season game in overtime.
The season was cancelled because of the 2004–05 NHL lockout.
Before the 2005–06 season, the NHL instituted a penalty shootout for regular-season games that remained tied after a five-minute overtime period, which prevented ties.
The season was shortened to 48 games because of the 2012–13 NHL lockout.
The NHL realigned its divisions before the 2013–14 season. The Rangers were placed in the Metropolitan Division.
The Rangers' season was shortened to 70 games because of the COVID-19 pandemic. The Rangers qualified for the NHL's expanded 24-team postseason.
  Due to the COVID-19 pandemic, the 2020–21 NHL season was shortened to 56 games.

References
General

Specific

New York Rangers
National Hockey League team seasons
seasons